Heron Carvic (born Geoffrey Richard William Harris; 21 January 1913 – 9 February 1980) was an English actor and writer who provided the voice for Gandalf in the BBC Radio version of The Hobbit, and played Caiaphas the High Priest every time the play cycle The Man Born to Be King was broadcast.

As a writer he created the characters and wrote the first five books featuring retired art teacher Miss Emily D. Seeton, a gentle parody of Agatha Christie's Miss Marple.  These were made available as eBooks in 2016.

Seriously injured in a road traffic accident near his home at Appledore, Kent, in August 1979, he never fully recovered and died in hospital the following February.

Ten years after Carvic's death, his books were re-issued in the US and proved sufficiently popular for his Estate to commission further Miss Seeton stories from two other writers using pseudonyms with "HC" initials. Roy Peter Martin as "Hampton Charles" wrote three novels, which were all released in 1990. Sarah J. Mason, writing as "Hamilton Crane", then took up the series.

Early life 
He ran away from Eton, and his father, to travel to France to earn a living for himself, and took his stage name as it derived from his grandmother but would "spare the sensibilities of his outraged family".  He met Phyllis Neilson-Terry when he was 23 (she was 20 years older), but they did not marry until 1958, when the register of marriages in July, August, and September lists Phyllis J King marrying both Heron Carvic and Geoffrey Harris.

Filmography
 Honeymoon for Three (1935)
 Doctor Who ... as Morpho (voice) in the serial The Keys of Marinus
 The Avengers ... as Five in episode "Square Root of Evil"
 Police Surgeon ... as Barrister in episode "Under the Influence"

Bibliography

 Picture Miss Seeton (1968)
 Miss Seeton Draws the Line (1969)
 Miss Seeton, Bewitched (1971) (US Title: Witch Miss Seeton)
 Miss Seeton Sings (1973)
 Odds on Miss Seeton (1975)

References

External links

1913 births
1980 deaths
English male radio actors
English male television actors
English male voice actors
English mystery writers
20th-century English novelists
20th-century English male actors
People educated at Eton College
Male actors from London